The 14th-century Norwich Cathedral astronomical clock was the earliest example of a large clock with automata in England, and the first to possess an astronomical dial. It replaced an earlier 13th-century "old clock", one of the earliest weight-driven mechanical timekeepers made in England.

The astronomical clock at Norwich Cathedral was located in the priory's south transept. There were images on the dial that may have represented the hours; 30 other images represented the days of the month. The clock's costs were recorded by the Benedictine monks in the priory's Sacrist’s Rolls from 1322 to 1325, which provide the earliest known detailed account of English clockmaking.

The clock was destroyed in a fire in the 17th century and was replaced in about 1620 by a simpler device, now lost, although two "jacquemarts" or clock-jacks have survived. The jacks were sold in around 1800, but were returned to the cathedral in 1878. They are located above the southern exit door, close to the original position of the astronomical clock.

The original clock
The original clock at Norwich Cathedral was one of the earliest mechanical timekeepers made in medieval England. The reference to a payment for a mechanical clock at the priory, dated 1273, is the first to occur in England. A clock at Dunstable Priory was recorded in 1283, but the clock at Norwich (which was at time a Benedictine priory) was already being repaired by 1290. It was almost certainly weight-driven (as opposed to being a water clock), as the rope needed to be replaced. When repairs were done in 1322, it was referred to as "the old clock".

The clock would have been expensive to build and maintain. It was unreliable enough for a new one to be commissioned, when in 1308 a visiting bishop complained and demanded that it be replaced.

The astronomical clock

Norwich’s great astronomical clock was built when William Kirby was prior. It is the earliest recorded example of a large clock designed to include automata, and the surviving records relating to its construction contain the earliest account known of the making of an astronomical dial. It was built into a wall across the south transept, and 200 pieces of Caen stone were used for the base.

The new clock was built to a high artistic standard. There was a painted and gilt moon, a sun (gilt copper) and brass pointers on the interior dial, which was painted on a panel and located under the exterior one. The dial was completed after having been originally wrecked by the clockmaker Robert de Turri, who became insolvent as a result of his poor workmanship on the clock. Other men who were hired to complete the job in London ruined the material, and the dial plate was only completed to a satisfactory standard after the clockmaker Robert de Stoke rode to London to supervise its construction. The 24 small images known to have been on the dial possibly represented each of the 24 hours in a day; another 30 images represented the days of the month.

The clock’s costs were recorded in Sacrist's Rolls from 1322 to 1325; these provide the earliest known detailed account of clockmaking in England: 

The clock cost £52 9s 6d to build, equivalent to about £24,000 in modern currency. It was expensive to maintain—in its second year £6 13s 9d (equivalent to about £3,000) was spent on it, which accounted for a third of the sacrist’s debts for that year. By 1324 large complex clocks were described as being common in English cathedrals.

The 17th-century clock

The medieval clock was destroyed by fire in the 17th century, and was replaced by a simpler one in around 1620. A painting made in around 1630 (known to exist in Strangers' Hall, Norwich, in 1946) described the south transept as "the Ile where the clock standeth".

According to a 1917 article in the Journal of the Royal Musical Association, "this clock fell into disrepair, and was never restored." The only parts of the Jacobean clock to survive are two "jacquemarts" or clock-jacks. The jacks were removed after it was decided that "their curious movements" were too distracting during cathedral services. In around 1800 they came into the possession of a Mr Briggs, a former bell-ringer at the cathedral. Briggs travelled around the region and used the jacks when working as an entertainer, singing and putting on a ventriloquist act. He returned to Norwich when he retired in 1845, after which the jacks were sold. They were subsequently repaired.

In 1878 the jacks were donated to the cathedral. Once designed to move on a pivot, they were fixed on an oak stand with a Latin inscription below each one, along with a poem on card, accompanied by an English translation.

The present clock in the south transept dates from the early 19th century.

Notes

References

Sources
 
 
 
 
 
 
 
 
 
 

Astronomical clocks in the United Kingdom
Individual clocks in England
Norwich Cathedral